= Transgender Persons (Protection of Rights) Bill, 2017 =

LGBTQ law in Pakistan

Transgender Persons (Protection of Rights) Bill, 2017 is a bill passed by Senate of Pakistan to recognize transgender rights and allow transgender individuals to register as their true gender.
